Crazy Alien is a 2019 Chinese science-fiction comedy film directed by Ning Hao and written by Sun Xiaohang, Wu Nan, Dong Runnian, Liu Xiaodan and Pan Yiran. The film stars Huang Bo and Shen Teng in the lead roles. It was released in China on February 5, 2019, the Chinese New Year.

Plot
An alien diplomat (Xu Zheng) is sent to Earth to establish intergalactic diplomatic relations. The superpower nation "Armenika" (a portmanteau of Armenia and the United States of America) selfishly hide this contact with alien life, believing they are "the most advanced civilization on earth" and therefore have the sole right to do so. However, the alien resents its assignment due to the requirement to interact with lower life forms.  The treaty must be signed by exchanging DNA which is performed by putting a ball into the mouth and coating it with saliva. Armenika's Captain Zach Andrews (Matthew Morrison), through his own sense of self-importance, fumbles the signing of the treaty when he takes a selfie, and the alien interprets the flash as a sign of aggression.  A satellite hits the alien spaceship, causing it to tumble out of orbit, landing in an amusement park.

Two Chinese men working at the park, monkey trainer Geng Hao (Huang Bo) and his business-savvy wine merchant friend Shen Tengfei (Shen Teng), find the crashed alien spaceship, mistaking the alien diplomat for an exotic South American monkey, and remove the alien's headband. Having been in the circus monkey business their entire life, they do not know anything else, so they begin to train the alien as a performing monkey, much to the diplomat's disgust. Meanwhile, Armenika sends John Stockton (Tom Pelphrey), their top operative, to search for the alien. The alien manages to take photographs of its surroundings by gaining access to its headband for brief periods of time, one of its gadgets apparently being a camera.  Due to the setting being an amusement park, it has many replicas of famous architectural monuments around the world. The Armenikan agents intercept the transmission of the photographs, believing it to be in those locations, they go to the Kremlin and the pyramids of Giza, shooting everyone along the way. They eventually catch up with the alien.

Meanwhile, Geng and Shen differ in opinion on what to do with the "monkey". Geng wishes to sell the "rare monkey" but Shen instead wishes to train the "monkey" in order to become a successful performer. The alien regains access to its headband which gives it telekinetic powers and confronts the two men, turning the tables and forcing them to perform for its amusement. It demands Geng sign the treaty by putting a new ball in his mouth, but he misunderstands and swallows the ball. They outsmart the alien, getting the alien very drunk, believing they have killed it, immerse its body in alcohol, planning to sell it. When the Armenikans arrive they hide the alien by dressing up their performing monkey in the alien's suit. They are taken with the disguised monkey to the Armenikan embassy, and the Armenikans interrogate them about the alien. They agree to help. Extracting the ball from his feces, Geng presents it to Agent Stockton, who proceeds to sign the treaty. The two men successfully pass off the monkey as the alien, performing their usual performing monkey show but with commentary explaining the fine points of intergalactic diplomatic etiquette and are let go. Stockton is told by a forensic scientist that the DNA they extracted from the ball was from a monkey, himself and an Asian man's feces. Discovering that he had been tricked, Stockton pursues the two men.

Upon returning home, Geng and Shen discover the alien has resurrected.  Stockton follows and arrives shortly after.  A final battle ensues and ends with the two Chinese men getting drunk with the alien, signing the treaty with a third and final ball and the alien telekinetically taking all the alcohol home with it.

Cast 
 Huang Bo as Geng Hao
 Shen Teng as Da Fei
 Matthew Morrison as Captain Zach Andrews
 Tom Pelphrey as John Stockton
 Kat Ann Nelson as CIA Officer
 Xu Zheng as Alien
 Mekael Turner as Agent A
 David Rayden as AA Meeting Host
 Nathaniel Boyd as Assistant to the Secretary of Defense
 Mathieu Jaquet as Bodyguard
 Michael J. Gralapp as NASA Commander
 Anthony Gavard as NASA Scientist
 Dan Darin-Zanco as Chief NASA Administrator
 Randall Lowell as National Security Council Member
 Scotty Bob Cox as Scientist
 Fei Deng as Director Ma

Production
Ning Hao stated that Crazy Alien is partly influenced by The Village Teacher written by Liu Cixin. He spent five years writing a script. Crazy Alien is the final installment in Ning Hao's black comedy trilogy. It began in 2006 with Crazy Stone, continuing with 2009's Crazy Racer.

Shooting began in Qingdao, Shandong on July 26, 2017 and ended on December 9 of that same year. Filming locations included Qingdao, Changsha, Russia and France.

Animal abuse controversy

PETA's account
In March 2018, a video surfaced showing a dog being spun around in a cage and dumped into cold water. The video was taped by a member of the movie crew. There was a claim that between shots, the dog was worked into a frenzy so he would bark as loudly as possible, and that this had been done on several takes. The director did not give a statement, but Crazy Alien actor Matthew Morrison said he was heartbroken after seeing the video.

Studio's response
The studio responded that the dog did fall into the water twice. They however contradicted PETA's account, arguing that the dogs were under the supervision and ownership of expert contractors and appropriate tents had been set up to dry the dogs with heating equipment. Several takes occurred without problem. On the final two takes the equipment failed resulting in the dog falling into the water. After the second failure the decision was made not to proceed but to use CGI. An empty cage was then repeatedly dropped into the water to be later combined with CGI. No animals sustained any injuries. Hao Ning, Director of the film, purchased the dog from the canine training school, which he personally vetted before hiring them to ensure the dogs were treated well, and it now lives in his family home. He named the dog "August 1st" (Chinese: 八一), the anniversary of the founding of the People's Liberation Army. Hao has invited journalists to his home to ensure that the dog is in good health and is treated well.

Release
Crazy Alien was released in China on February 5, 2019.

Reception

Box office
The film earned a total of 1 billion yuan in its first 3 days of release, grossing 1,500 million yuan on its opening weekend. It has grossed nearly 2,000 million yuan.

Notes

References

External links
 
 
 

2019 films
2010s Mandarin-language films
Animal cruelty incidents in film
Chinese science fiction comedy films
Film controversies in China
Films directed by Ning Hao
Films scored by Nathan Wang
Films shot in Hunan
Films shot in Shandong
Films shot in Russia
Films shot in France